René Strehler (born 13 April 1934 in Affoltern am Albis) is a Swiss former professional racing cyclist. He was the Swiss National Road Race champion in 1960.

Major results

 1953
 1st, National Track Championship, Amateur Pursuit
 1st, National Road Championships, Amateurs

 1954
 1st, National Track Championship, Amateur Pursuit

 1955
 1st, Stage 6, Tour de Suisse
 2nd, Pursuit, UCI Track Cycling World Championships
 1st, Overall, Tour de Romandie
 1st, Stage 1
 3rd, Stage 2
 1st, Stage 3a

 1956
 Tour de Suisse
 1st, Stage 1
 1st, Stage 3
 1st, Stage 8
 3rd, Overall, Tour de Romandie
 2nd, Stage 1
 1st, Stage 2
 3rd, Stage 3b
 2nd, Stage 4

 1960
 1st, Bern-Genève
 1st, National Road Championships
 3rd, Overall, Tour de Suisse
 2nd, Stage 4
 1st, Berner Rundfahrt

References

External links 

Swiss male cyclists
1934 births
Living people
People from Affoltern District
Tour de Suisse stage winners
Sportspeople from the canton of Zürich